The Skelton Transmitting Station is a radio transmitter site at  near Skelton, Cumbria, England, about  north-west of Penrith, run by Babcock International and owned by the Ministry of Defence. Since the Belmont Mast in Lincolnshire was shortened in 2010, the mast at Skelton has been the tallest structure in the United Kingdom.

History

Construction
The site was built by J. L. Eve Construction during the Second World War, for long-distance short-wave transmissions, across Europe.

Transmissions
In 1946, the BBC was heralding the site as being "the World's largest and most powerful (shortwave) radio station".

The main purpose of it is shortwave broadcasting. The site is capable of Digital Radio Mondiale (DRM) on at least 3955 kHz and 3975 kHz (75m broadcast band) beamed at 121° towards Germany and Central Europe. On AM the frequencies of 5995 kHz and 6195 kHz (49m broadcast band) and 9410 kHz (31m broadcast band) and 12095 kHz (25m broadcast band) are known.

A Royal Navy very low frequency (VLF) transmitter is also located there. It is used to transmit encrypted orders to submarines, including the Trident SLBM fleet. It uses as its aerial a 365-metre (1,198 foot) high guyed steel lattice mast, which is insulated against ground and is the tallest structure in the UK. The transmitter went into service in 2001 and is the successor to the GBR transmitter at Rugby Radio Station.

See also

List of masts
List of tallest buildings and structures in Great Britain
List of radio stations in the United Kingdom

References

External links
 
 http://skyscraperpage.com/diagrams/?b40685

Buildings and structures in Cumbria
Radio masts and towers in Europe
Skelton, Cumbria
Telecommunications in World War II
Transmitter sites in England
Shortwave radio stations